Mendip is a local government district of Somerset in England. The district takes its name from the Mendip Hills which lie in its northwest. The administrative centre of the district is Shepton Mallet but the largest town (three times larger than Shepton Mallet) is Frome.

The district was formed on 1 April 1974 under the Local Government Act 1972, by a merger of the municipal boroughs of Glastonbury and Wells, along with Frome, Shepton Mallet, Street urban districts, and Frome Rural District, Shepton Mallet Rural District, Wells Rural District, part of Axbridge Rural District and part of Clutton Rural District.

On 1 April 2023, the district will be abolished and replaced by a new unitary district for the area at present served by Somerset County Council.  The new council will be known as Somerset Council.

Toponymy
Several explanations for the name Mendip have been suggested. Its earliest known form is Mendepe in 1185. One suggestion is that it is derived from the medieval term . However, A D Mills derives its meaning from Celtic , meaning mountain or hill, with an uncertain second element, perhaps Old English  in the sense of upland, or plateau.

An alternative explanation is that the name is cognate with Mened (Welsh ), a Brythonic term for upland moorland. The suffix may be a contraction of the Anglo-Saxon , meaning a valley. Possible further meanings have been identified.

Governance

The district falls under the jurisdiction of Mendip District Council. As of the 2019 Local elections, the Council went to No Overall Control.

As of March 2022, the council has 23 Liberal Democrats, 12 Conservatives, 10 Greens, and 2 Independents

Abolition
On 1 April 2023, the council will be abolished and replaced by a new unitary authority for the area at present served by Somerset County Council.  The new council will be known as Somerset Council. Elections for the new council took place in May 2022, with it running alongside Mendip and the other councils until their abolition in April 2023.

Settlements

The five main settlements in Mendip are:

 Frome
 Glastonbury
 Shepton Mallet
 Street
 Wells

Frome, Glastonbury and Shepton Mallet are the only towns in the district, as Wells has city status and Street has maintained its status as a village despite a population in excess of 11,000.

Other villages and hamlets include:

 Ashwick
 Baltonsborough – Batcombe – Beckington – Binegar – Bleadney – Bowlish – Buckland Dinham – Burcott – Butleigh – Butleigh Wootton
 Chantry – Charterhouse – Chelynch – Chesterblake – Chewton Mendip – Chilcompton – Coleford – Coxley – Cranmore – Croscombe
 Dean – Dinder – Ditcheat – Doulting – Draycott – Dulcote
 East Lydford – East Pennard – Easton – Emborough – Evercreech
 Farleigh Hungerford – Faulkland
 Godney – Great Elm – Green Ore
 Henton – Highbury – Holcombe – Hornblotton – Horrington – Huxham Green
 Kilmersdon
 Lamyatt – Leigh-on-Mendip – Leighton – Litton – Lydford-on-Fosse
 Maesbury – Meare – Mells
 Nettlebridge – North Wootton – Norton St Philip – Nunney
 Oakhill – Oldford
 Pilton – Polsham – Prestleigh – Priddy – Pylle
 Rode – Rodney Stoke
 Southway – Standerwick – Ston Easton – Stratton-on-the-Fosse – Stoke St Michael – Stoney Stratton
 Thrupe – Trudoxhill
 Upton Noble
 Vobster
 Walton – Wanstrow – Waterlip – West Compton – West Lydford – West Pennard – West Woodlands – Westbury-sub-Mendip – Westcombe – Westhay – Whatley – Wookey – Wookey Hole – Worminster – Witham Friary
 Yarley

Parishes

Transport

Major roads
 A37 from Bristol to Yeovil
 A361 from the M5 to Frome
 A371 from Weston-super-Mare to Wincanton
 A39 from Bath to Bridgwater

Railways

Railway stations
 Frome railway station served by Great Western Railway on the Heart of Wessex Line and Reading to Taunton Line.

East Somerset Railway

Railway stations
 Cranmore railway station 
 Cranmore West railway station
 Merryfield Lane railway station
 Mendip Vale railway station
served by the East Somerset Railway.

Education

County schools (those which are not independent) in the five non-metropolitan districts of the county are operated by Somerset County Council.

For a full list of schools see: List of schools in Somerset

See also

 Grade I listed buildings in Mendip
 Grade II* listed buildings in Mendip
 List of Scheduled Monuments in Mendip

References

External links
Mendip District Council

 
Non-metropolitan districts of Somerset
1974 establishments in England